Daiba Station is the name of two railway stations in Japan:

 Daiba Station (Shizuoka) (大場駅)
 Daiba Station (Tokyo) (台場駅)